"Fix" is a song performed by American contemporary R&B group Blackstreet, originally appearing as the fourth track on their second studio album Another Level. A remixed version of the song was issued as the third single from the album and features the band Fishbone, as well as  Ol' Dirty Bastard and ad-libs by Guns N' Roses guitarist, Slash. The song peaked at number 58 on the Billboard Hot 100 in 1997.

The album version of the song contains a sample of "The Message" by Grandmaster Flash and the Furious Five; and the song was later sampled in "Jambo 1997" by Tonex. The physical single contains an excerpt of "Man Behind the Music" by Queen Pen.

The song was remixed again for the Soul Food soundtrack. This version, titled "Call Me", includes a rap verse from Jay-Z. All versions of the song feature all four members on lead vocals.

Music video

The official music video for the song was directed by Paul Hunter.

Chart

Weekly charts

Year-end charts

References

External links
 
 

1996 songs
1997 singles
Blackstreet songs
Ol' Dirty Bastard songs
Slash (musician) songs
Fishbone songs
Interscope Records singles
Music videos directed by Paul Hunter (director)
Song recordings produced by Teddy Riley
Songs written by Teddy Riley
Songs written by Ol' Dirty Bastard
Songs written by Slash (musician)
Songs written by Duke Bootee
Songs written by Melle Mel
Songs written by Sylvia Robinson